Daniel Benson may refer to:

Daniel R. Benson (born 1975), member of the New Jersey General Assembly
Dan Benson (born 1987), former American actor, played Zeke Beakerman on Disney Channel series Wizards of Waverly Place